The Anarchist Collectives: Workers’ Self-Management in the Spanish Revolution, 1936–1939 is a book of perspectives from the Spanish Revolution edited by Sam Dolgoff and published with Free Life Editions in 1974.

Further reading

External links 

 

1974 non-fiction books
Spanish Revolution of 1936
English-language books
History books about anarchism